Ceroplesis poggei is a species of beetle in the family Cerambycidae. It was described by Harold in 1878. It is known from Angola, the Democratic Republic of the Congo, the Republic of the Congo, Mozambique, Uganda, Tanzania, Zimbabwe, and Zambia.

Subspecies
 Ceroplesis poggei malepicta Fairmaire, 1882
 Ceroplesis poggei poggei Harold, 1878

References

poggei
Beetles described in 1878